Karlodinium is a genus of athecate dinoflagellates. They are often toxin producing, and compared to the other members of the Kareniaceae, are fairly small at <8-15 µm diameter.

Species 
 Karlodinium antarcticum
 Karlodinium armiger
 Karlodinium ballantinum
 Karlodinium conicum
 Karlodinium corrugatum
 Karlodinium decipiens
 Karlodinium veneficum

References

Dinoflagellate genera
Gymnodiniales